KRRS (1460 AM) is a radio station broadcasting a Regional Mexican format. Licensed to Santa Rosa, California, United States, it serves the Santa Rosa area. The station is currently owned by California Broadcasting Company, LLC.

External links
FCC History Cards for KRRS

Mass media in Sonoma County, California
RRS
Mass media in Santa Rosa, California
RRS